Aukland is a Norwegian surname, and may refer to:

 Anders Aukland (born 1972), Norwegian cross country skier
 Jørgen Aukland (born 1975), Norwegian cross-country skier
 Knut Aukland (1929–2014), Norwegian physiologist
 Lisa Aukland (born 1957), American professional bodybuilder and powerlifter

Surnames
Norwegian-language surnames